Gary Wallis (born 12 July 1946) is a former Australian rules footballer who played with  and  in the Victorian Football League (VFL) during the 1960s.

Wallis was captain of the Collingwood Under-19s team which won a premiership in 1965. The following season he was a regular in the seniors and played 17 games of a possible 20 games. Wallis, who kicked 27 goals that year, was a member of the Collingwood side which lost the 1966 VFL Grand Final.

A rover, he was let go by Collingwood during the 1968 VFL season and finished the year at St Kilda.

Wallis transferred to South Australian National Football League (SANFL) club West Adelaide in 1969, winning the club's Best & Fairest award in his first season with them and won the award for a second time in 1973.

His father, Tom Wallis, had played at Collingwood in the 1940s.

References

1946 births
Australian rules footballers from Victoria (Australia)
Collingwood Football Club players
St Kilda Football Club players
West Adelaide Football Club players
Lalor Football Club players
Living people